Edward Tandy McGlasson (born July 11, 1956) is a former American football offensive lineman in the National Football League (NFL) and pastors the Stadium Vineyard Church in Anaheim, California.  Born and raised in Potomac, Maryland, he played for the Youngstown State Penguins, Los Angeles Rams, the New York Jets and the New York Giants before entering full-time ministry.  He has spoken at numerous conferences across the country.

After getting healed from a knee injury that led to his conversion, McGlasson eventually entered the ministry after another knee injury ended his NFL career.

McGlasson has written a book entitled "The Difference A Father Makes: Calling out the magnificent destiny in your children", published in 2004 by Ampelon Publishing.

Personal
McGlasson and his wife, Jill, live in Orange, California with their five children: Edward, Jessica (her husband Gregory Irwin and granddaughter Isla), Mary, Lukas and Joshua.

References

External links
Stadium Vineyard Church

1956 births
Living people
Sportspeople from Annapolis, Maryland
American football centers
Youngstown State Penguins football players
New York Jets players
St. Louis Rams players
New York Giants players
Players of American football from Maryland